Kinnon Beaton (born March 26, 1956) is a Canadian musician from Mabou, Nova Scotia. He is the son of Donald Angus Beaton and Elizabeth MacEachen.

He plays the fiddle in the Scottish genre famous throughout Cape Breton Island.

He has published a book of violin music The Beaton Collection

References 

1956 births
People from Inverness County, Nova Scotia
Canadian male violinists and fiddlers
Musicians from Nova Scotia
Cape Breton fiddlers
Living people
21st-century Canadian violinists and fiddlers
21st-century Canadian male musicians